Collegiove is a  (municipality) in the Province of Rieti in the Italian region of Latium, located about  northeast of Rome and about  southeast of Rieti.

Collegiove borders the following municipalities: Ascrea, Collalto Sabino, Marcetelli, Paganico Sabino, Pozzaglia Sabina, Turania.

References

Cities and towns in Lazio